Nagarnabi railway station (code:NGF) is a small station located on the Jharkhand–West Bengal border. It is the last railway station of Jharkhand falling on the Sahibganj loop line under Eastern Railway zone.

References

Railway stations in Pakur district
Howrah railway division